Estadio La Portada is a multi-use stadium in La Serena, Chile.  It is currently used mostly for football matches and is the home stadium of Deportes La Serena. The stadium holds 18, 243 people, was built in 1952, and completely renovated in 2015, in time for the 2015 Copa America.

2015 Copa América

References

La Portada
La Portada
Sports venues in Coquimbo Region
La Serena, Chile
Sports venues completed in 1952